The Yunnan box turtle (Cuora yunnanensis) is a species of turtle in the family Geoemydidae (formerly Bataguridae). It is believed to be  endemic to Yunnan, China (in Kunming and Huize) and was suspected to be extinct since the early 20th century; the last verified specimen was collected in 1940.

In 2004, a living female appeared from the pet trade in Kunming; one year later, a male from the same source and again one year later another female were found there. The validity of these specimens was doubted and many believed they were intentionally produced hybrids, a common technique in China to produce turtles that get high prices.

In 2007, He et al. sampled the three living specimens and gave the genetic proof that all three living specimens are indeed C. yunnanensis and not hybrids. In 2008, Kadoorie Conservation China, a department of Kadoorie Farm and Botanic Garden, together with the Kunming Institute of Zoology and Chinese Academy of Sciences, discovered a small wild population. The distribution of this species remains unclear, but due to its value, it is heavily sought after. Protection measures are needed to save this probably highly endangered species from its return onto the IUCN list of extinct animals.

References

 Blanck, T., Zhou, T. & W. P. McCord (2006): The Yunnan box turtle, Cuora yunnanensis (BOULENGER 1906); historical background and an update on the morphology, distribution and vulnerabilities of the only known living specimens. SACALIA 13 (4), 2006: 14-35
 Blanck, T. (2005): Cuora yunnanensis (BOULENGER, 1906), the Yunnan Box Turtle, Rediscovered after One-hundred Years? CUORA Special - RADIATA 14 (2), 2005: 10-33
 He J.,T. Zhou, Rao D.-Q. & Y.-P. Zhang.2007 Molecular identification and phylogenetic position of Cuora yunnanensis. Chinese Science Bulletin.52(17):2085-2088(in Chinese)
 PARHAM, J. F., B. L. STUART, R. BOUR & U. FRITZ. 2004. Evolutionary distinctiveness of the extinct Yunnan box turtle (Cuora yunnanensis) revealed by DNA from an old museum specimen. – Proceedings of the Royal Society of Biology (Supplement), Biological Letters, London, 271: 391-394 + Electronic Appendix A, 6 pp.
 ZHOU, T. & E. ZHAO (2004): On the occurrence of living Cuora yunnanensis since fifty-eight years and its description. . Sichuan J. Zool., Chengdu 23 (4): 325-327 + 1 Plate(in Chinese)
 ZHOU, T. (2005): Discovery of a Living Male Yunnan Box Turtle, Cuora yunnanensis BOULENGER, 1906. Sichuan J. Zool., Chengdu 24 (3): 345-346 + 1 Plate(in Chinese)

External links
 World Chelonian Trust: Cuora Gallery. Contains C. yunnanensis museum specimen photos. Retrieved 2007-SEP-01.

Cuora
Endemic fauna of Yunnan
Reptiles of China
Reptiles described in 1906
Taxonomy articles created by Polbot
Critically endangered fauna of China